{{Infobox station
| name                = Aswarby and Scredington
| status              = Disused
| image               = Scredington Station - geograph.org.uk - 154559.jpg
| caption             = Station buildings are now a private home
| borough             = Scredington, North Kesteven
| country             = England
| grid_name           = Grid reference
| grid_position       = 
| original            = Great Northern Railway
| pregroup            = Great Northern Railway
| postgroup           = London and North Eastern Railway
| years               = 2 January 1872
| events              = Station opened as Scredington| years1              = 1 February 1875
| events1             = Station renamed Aswarby and Scredington''
| years2              = 22 September 1930
| events2             = Station closed
}}Aswarby and Scredington railway station''' was a station close to Scredington, Lincolnshire on the Great Northern Railway Bourne and Sleaford railway. It opened in 1872 and closed in 1930. It was originally shown on maps as Aswarby Station, but by 1905 it was shown as Aswarby and Scredington Station.

History

Opened by the Great Northern Railway (Great Britain), it became part of the London and North Eastern Railway during the Grouping of 1923, and was then closed by that company.

References

Notes

Sources

External links
 Aswarby and Scredington Station on navigable OS map
; Aswarby station on 1891 OS map.

Disused railway stations in Lincolnshire
Former Great Northern Railway stations
Railway stations in Great Britain opened in 1872
Railway stations in Great Britain closed in 1930
1872 establishments in England
1930 disestablishments in England